The Atlas H-10 was the prototype for a four-seat cabin monoplane aircraft, registered N37463, designed by Max Harlow, which was flown in the United States shortly after World War II.

History
The Atlas H-10 had been constructed from the unfinished Harlow PJC-4 sporting monoplane which had been left uncompleted at the outbreak of the conflict. The water heater company Rheem Manufacturing Company briefly invested in the project as the PCC-10 (Pasadena City College Model 10) but did not pursue the business. Pasadena students completed the aircraft, and its first flight was on 4 October 1945 with a 220 hp Lycoming.

It was a low-wing cantilever monoplane of aluminum semi-monocoque configuration with retractable tailwheel undercarriage and powered by a variety of engines throughout its life. Originally powered by a Lycoming O-435, it was re-engined with two Continental O-300s driving contra-rotating propellers through a common gearbox and registered as the Mono-Twin. In turn, this arrangement was replaced with a Franklin 6AB and finally a Lycoming IO-720, each driving a single propeller. The cabin layout was also modified.

Operational history
Only the single H-10 was completed and flown. In the early 1970s it was based at Long Beach Airport in southern California.

As of 2006, the aircraft was reportedly still in existence in a dismantled state in the hands of a Californian collector.

Variants

Harlow PJC-4
Original design
Atlas PCC-10
Test aircraft
Atlas H-10
Redesignated production aircraft
Atlas Mono-Twin
Re-engined prototype with twin radial

Specifications (with Continental engines)

References

 
 aerofiles.com

Harlow aircraft
1940s United States civil utility aircraft
Single-engined tractor aircraft
Low-wing aircraft
Aircraft first flown in 1945